The Hermitage of Braid is an area between the Braid Hills and Blackford Hill. The Braid Burn runs through it. It comprises part of the  Hermitage of Braid and Blackford Hill Local Nature Reserve.

History
The Braid estate was the property of the de Brad family one of whom, Henri de Brad, was Sheriff of Edinburgh in the 12th century. A castle stood on the estate until the 18th century. In the 18th century the estate was purchased by the lawyer Charles Gordon of Cluny (died 1814), who commissioned the present house, known as Hermitage of Braid or Hermitage House, which stands on the north side of the Braid Burn. The house was built in 1785 by the Edinburgh architect Robert Burn. The castellated Gothic style may have been influenced by the work of Robert Adam. Charles Gordon's son was the soldier and MP Colonel John Gordon (c.1776–1858). The house is a category A listed building.

In 1937 the then owner of the Hermitage, John McDougal, gifted the land to the city for use as a public park. A pillar in the grounds records the gift, and the subsequent opening of the park on 10 June 1938 by Lord Provost Sir Louis Gumley. The house is now a visitor centre for the nature reserve, and offices of the City of Edinburgh Council's Countryside Natural Heritage Service.

References

External links

Friends of Hermitage of Braid & Blackford Hill

Parks and commons in Edinburgh
Local nature reserves in Scotland
Category A listed buildings in Edinburgh
Listed houses in Scotland